Daniel António Lopes Ramos (born 25 December 1970) is a Portuguese former footballer who played as a midfielder, currently a manager.

After a playing career spent mostly at the lower levels, he embarked on a managerial career of over two decades. He led six clubs in the second tier, and five in the Primeira Liga.

Playing career
Born in Vila do Conde, Ramos' professional input during his nine-year senior career consisted in nine Segunda Liga games, with Rio Ave FC (six) and S.C. Beira-Mar (three). He retired in June 1998, at the age of only 27.

Coaching career
Ramos started working as a coach with his last club Vilanovense FC, in 2001. In the following years he alternated between the second and third divisions, his first job at the professional level being with G.D. Chaves in the 2004–05 campaign. In June 2011, he won the third-tier title with C.F. União, and left days later for Associação Naval 1º de Maio.

In early 2014, Ramos was appointed at division three side F.C. Famalicão, achieving promotion in his first full season and leaving on 17 May 2016. Shortly after, he signed a one-year contract with C.D. Santa Clara also in the second tier.

On 22 September 2016, after six wins and one draw in the first seven games, Ramos left the Azores and joined C.S. Marítimo of the Primeira Liga, then ranking second from bottom in the table. He eventually led his team to the sixth place, with the subsequent qualification to the UEFA Europa League.

With a year left on his Marítimo contract, Ramos moved back to Chaves in June 2018 for a fee of around €100,000 after their loss of Luís Castro to Vitória de Guimarães. He resigned by mutual consent on 10 December, with the team in last place.

At the start of 2019, Ramos was hired by Rio Ave for the rest of the season after José Gomes moved to Reading. After he guided them to seventh place, both parties agreed not to renew.

On 18 December 2019, Ramos was appointed at Boavista F.C. for the second half of the campaign; the Porto-based club had sacked Lito Vidigal when eighth in the league. At the end of the season he returned to Santa Clara, replacing João Henriques on a one-year deal. The side finished a best-ever sixth and qualified for the inaugural edition of the UEFA Europa Conference League; he was awarded with a 12-month extension.

In October 2021, Ramos rescinded his contract and moved abroad for the first time, signing a two-year deal at Al Faisaly FC in the Saudi Professional League. The following 24 February, after only one win in ten matches, he left by mutual consent.

Managerial statistics

References

External links

1970 births
Living people
People from Vila do Conde
Sportspeople from Porto District
Portuguese footballers
Association football midfielders
Liga Portugal 2 players
Segunda Divisão players
Rio Ave F.C. players
F.C. Maia players
Leça F.C. players
S.C. Beira-Mar players
F.C. Marco players
Portuguese football managers
Primeira Liga managers
Liga Portugal 2 managers
S.C. Dragões Sandinenses managers
G.D. Chaves managers
C.D. Trofense managers
Moreirense F.C. managers
Gondomar S.C. managers
F.C. Vizela managers
Associação Naval 1º de Maio managers
F.C. Famalicão managers
C.D. Santa Clara managers
C.S. Marítimo managers
Rio Ave F.C. managers
Boavista F.C. managers
Saudi Professional League managers
Al-Faisaly FC managers
Portuguese expatriate football managers
Expatriate football managers in Saudi Arabia
Portuguese expatriate sportspeople in Saudi Arabia